Krisztina Dávid (born 5 December 1975) is a Hungarian Paralympic shooter. She won a bronze medal at the 2020 Summer Paralympics in Tokyo.

References

External links
 Her profile at the Hungarian Paralympic Committee
 Her profile at the International Paralympic Committee

1975 births
Living people
Hungarian female sport shooters
Paralympic bronze medalists for Hungary
Paralympic medalists in shooting
Shooters at the 2012 Summer Paralympics
Shooters at the 2016 Summer Paralympics
Shooters at the 2020 Summer Paralympics
Medalists at the 2020 Summer Paralympics
Paralympic shooters of Hungary
Sportspeople from Szeged
21st-century Hungarian women